Olivier-Maurice Clément (November 17, 1921 – January 15, 2009) was an Eastern Orthodox theologian, who taught at St. Sergius Orthodox Theological Institute in Paris, France. He actively promoted the reunification of Christians (he was friends with Pope John Paul II), dialogue between Christians and people of other beliefs, and the engagement of Christian thinkers with modern thought and society.

Biography
Olivier-Maurice Clement was born on 17 November 1921, into an agnostic family from the Cevennes.

He became a follower of Jesus Christ at the age of thirty, after a long search in atheism and in Asian spiritualities.  He had discovered, through  reading the Christian philosophers Nicholas Berdyaev and Vladimir Lossky (of whom he would become a student and a friend), the thinking of the Fathers of the ancient, undivided Church, and he received baptism in the Orthodox Church, within the French-speaking diocese of the Moscow Patriarchate in Paris.  He described his childhood, spiritual wanderings and conversion in his autobiography, L'Autre Soleil (The Other Sun) (ed.  Stock 1986).

As a history professor, he taught at the Louis-le-Grand lyceum in Paris for a long time.  As a professor of the St. Sergius Orthodox Theological Institute (Institut Saint-Serge) he became one of the most highly regarded witnesses to Orthodox Christianity, as well as one of the most prolific.  He was a founder of the Orthodox Fellowship in Western Europe, and was the author of thirty books on the life, thought and history of the Orthodox Church, and their meeting with other Christians, the non-Christian religions and modernity. He was responsible for the theological journal, Contacts, and became a Doctor honoris causa at the Institute for theology in Bucharest and at the Catholic University in Louvain.

Within the scope of his teaching activities, Olivier Clement was particularly engaged in the life and testimony of the Orthodox Church in France.  He also inspired the work of the Orthodox Fellowship in Western Europe from its founding in the early 1960s and participated in Orthodox Christian conferences in western Europe from 1971, when every third year Orthodox Christians from the four corners the continent would meet to pray and reflect together.

Among contemporary Orthodox theologians he was one who gave most attention to questions of modernity; which he sought to answer through a powerful and poetic reflection, rooted in the tradition of the Church as well as creative and renewing.  He was an interlocutor with  several great spiritual leaders of his time - Saint Sophrony of Maldon monastery in Britain, Patriarch Athenagoras, Pope John Paul II, theologian Dumitru Staniloae, Brother Roger of Taizé, Andrea Riccardi, founder of the Sant'Egidio community - with all of whom he formed a relationship of trust and friendship.

He died on 15 January 2009.

Bibliography
 Transfigurer le Temps (Delachaux & Niestlé, Paris, 1959) with a 2019 English translation by Jeremy N. Ingpen entitled Transfiguring Time: Understanding Time in the Light of the Orthodox Tradition (New City Press, 2019)
 Roots of Christian Mysticism: Texts from Patristic Era with Commentary (with Jean-Claude Barreau) (1995)   
 You Are Peter: An Orthodox Reflection on the Exercise of Papal Primacy (2003. New City Press)   
 Taize: A Meaning to Life (Paperback) (1997. GIA publications)   
 Three Prayers: The Lord's Prayer, O Heavenly King, the Prayer of Saint (2000. St. Vladimir's Seminary Press)   
 On Human Being: A Spiritual Anthropology (Theology and Faith) (2000. New City Press)   
 Dialogues Avec Le Patriarche Athenagoras (1969. Fayard) ASIN: B0010ED7ZA 
 Le Chemin de Croix à Rome (O.clement) (Paperback) (1998. Desclée de Brouwer)  
 The Church of Orthodoxy (Religions of Humanity) (2002. Chelsea House Publications)   
 Conversations With Ecumenical Patriarch Bartholomew I (1997. St. Vladimir's Seminary Press)   
 Berdiaev, un philosophe russe en France (Collection DDB) (1991. Desclee de Brouwer)  
 The Spirit of Solzhenitsyn (1976. Barnes & Noble Books)

References

Online works
 Noesis The Glory of God Hidden in His Creatures
 Jesus, terre de vivants

1921 births
2009 deaths
Eastern Orthodox theologians
Eastern Orthodox Christians from France
Converts to Eastern Orthodoxy from atheism or agnosticism
People in Christian ecumenism